Insolito are a British post-hardcore band formed in Birmingham, England, in 2009. They have toured with the likes of The Devil Wears Prada, Carcer City and Exit Ten.

History

Early years (2009–2012)
The band was founded by school friends: Aaron Coton (drummer) and Andy Robinson (guitarist) in Birmingham. Coton was friendly with Dave Stait (bassist) through University and they discovered they had some similar tastes in music. Coton had also previously shared a band with James Wadey (vocals) and it was decided that he was to be the man to front the band.

During this period the band's musical style was heavily metal influenced with very little clean vocals in any tracks. After discussions in 2010 it was decided that for the band to progress they would need the services of a vocalist. After a short audition period Alex Gibbs joined the band.

Why Die Wondering? (2012)
Insolito released their début EP, Why Die Wondering on 1 October 2012 after a heavy period of touring. Shortly after this Smit Trivedi (bassist) was recruited and Stait moved to play second guitar.

Band members
Alex Gibbs - clean vocals (2010–present)
James Wadey - screamed/growled vocals (2009–present)
Andy Robinson - guitar (2009–present)
Dave Stait - guitar (2009–present)
Aaron Coton - drums, percussion (2009–present)
Smit Trivedi- bass guitar, backing vocals (2012–present)

Discography

EPs
2012: Why Die Wondering?

Singles
2011: "Why Die Wondering"

References 

Musical groups established in 2009
British post-hardcore musical groups